Jamesia lineata is a species of beetle in the family Cerambycidae. It was described by Fisher in 1926. It is known from Saint Lucia.

References

Onciderini
Beetles described in 1926